Cooliris, Inc. was a US corporation headquartered in San Francisco, California, that developed photo viewing products on mobile, web, and desktop platforms. It was a venture backed by Kleiner Perkins Caufield & Byers, T-Venture, DAG Ventures, The Westly Group and NTT DOCOMO.

History 
The company was initially best known for its signature user interface, the Cooliris 3D Wall, which provided a 3D-like immersive media-viewing experience.

In January 2010, Google, Inc. tapped Cooliris to develop Android Gallery, a native photo application installed on over 40 million smartphones then running the Android operating system. The company’s core product was the Cooliris mobile photo viewing and sharing app for iPad and iPhone, launched in July 2012.

On November 21, 2014, Cooliris was acquired by Yahoo!.

References

External links

Software companies based in California
Companies established in 2006
Companies based in San Francisco
Yahoo! acquisitions
Defunct software companies of the United States